General Joubert refers to Piet Joubert (1831–1900), Commandant-General of the South African Republic. General Joubert may also refer to:

Barthélemy Catherine Joubert (1769–1799), French First Republic general
Francois Gerhardus Joubert (1827–1903), Boer general

See also
Pierre Joseph Joubert de La Salette (1743–1833), French general of the Revolution and the Empire